Ivan Gorshkov (7 May 1889 Tallinn – 29 January 1943 Gorki Oblast) was an Estonian politician. He was a member of the V Riigikogu.

References

1889 births
1943 deaths
Politicians from Tallinn
People from Kreis Harrien 
Estonian people of Russian descent
Members of the Riigikogu, 1932–1934
Estonian people executed by the Soviet Union